Fair Lady is a South African women's magazine that is often considered as the sister publication to the Afrikaans Sarie. With their offices in Cape Town, this title is one of the most popular female reads in South Africa.

History and profile
Fair Lady was established in 1965. The magazine is published on a monthly basis. The editor for Fair Lady is Suzy Brokenshaw and its publisher, Patricia Scholtemeyer. The magazine is owned by Media24. Its target audience is married or divorced women.

In May 2015 Fair Lady launched the Women of the Future Awards targeting successful South African women entrepreneurs.

References

External links
 Fair Lady web site

1965 establishments in South Africa
Magazines established in 1965
Magazines published in South Africa
Mass media in Cape Town
Monthly magazines published in South Africa
Women's magazines
History of women in South Africa